Uwe Witt (born 1 October 1959 in Witten) is a German politician (independent, formerly AfD and Centre Party). He has been a member of the Bundestag since 2017.

Life 
Born in Witten, North Rhine-Westphalia, Witt became a member of the Bundestag after the 2017 German federal election. Witt has served as a party list member of the Bundestag from the state of North Rhine-Westphalia since 2017. He previously served as a member of Alternative for Germany before defecting to the Centre Party in January 2022.

He is a member of the Committee for Labour and Social Affairs and the Committee for Health.

References

External links 

  
 Bundestag biography 

1959 births
Living people
Members of the Bundestag for North Rhine-Westphalia
Members of the Bundestag 2021–2025
Members of the Bundestag 2017–2021
Members of the Bundestag for the Alternative for Germany
Members of the Bundestag for Schleswig-Holstein
Centre Party (Germany) politicians